"Fire in the hole" is an expression indicating that an explosive detonation in a confined space is imminent.  It originated from American miners, who needed to warn their fellows that a charge had been set. The phrase appears in this sense in American state mining regulations, in military and corporate procedures, and in various mining and military blasting-related print books and narratives, e.g., during bomb disposal or throwing grenades into a confined space. 

In common parlance it has become a catchphrase for a warning of the type "Watch out!" or "Heads up!". 

NASA has used the term to describe a means of staging a multistage rocket vehicle by igniting the upper stage simultaneously with the ejection of the lower stage, without a usual delay of several seconds. On the Apollo 5 unmanned flight test of the first Apollo Lunar Module, a "fire in the hole test" used this procedure to simulate a lunar landing abort. Gene Kranz describes the test in his autobiography:

References 

English phrases
Explosion protection